TASC may refer to:

 Take a Swing at Cancer, a non-profit charity, United States
 TASC FC, a football club in Botswana
 Tasmanian Assessment, Standards and Certification, part of the education system in Tasmania, Australia
 Technology and Social Change Centre (TaSC), University of Essex, England
 Test Assessing Secondary Completion (TASC), a high school equivalency exam developed by CTB/McGraw-Hill
 The Alliance for Safe Children, an American non-profit organisation researching child safety in Asia
 The Analytic Sciences Corporation, Inc., or TASC, Inc., a private defense contractor of Chantilly, Virginia, USA
 Think tank for Action on Social Change, a think tank based in Ireland
 Total Absorption Shower Counters, large, modularized NaI(Tl) particle detectors developed at Stanford University in 1976
 Train Automatic Stopping Controller, a train protection system used in Japan
 TransAtlantic Inter-Society Consensus, on the management of peripheral arterial disease

See also
 Leeds Trinity University, university in Leeds, England, from previous name "Trinity and All Saints College"